Kyndryl Holdings, Inc. is an American multinational information technology infrastructure services provider that designs, builds, manages and develops large-scale information systems. It was created from the spin-off of IBM's infrastructure services business. It is currently the world’s largest IT infrastructure services provider.

History
Kyndryl comprises the bulk of the former IBM Global Technology Services. At year-end 2020, it had a portfolio of nearly 4,400 customers, including 75% of the Fortune 100. After having a placeholder name of NewCo, it was given the name Kyndryl in April 2021, with "Kyn" referencing "kinship" and "Dryl" referencing "tendril".

On November 4, 2021, Kyndryl completed its separation from IBM and began trading as an independent company on the New York Stock Exchange under the ticker KD. It is led by chairman and CEO Martin Schroeter, who was IBM's Chief Financial Officer from 2014 through the end of 2017.

Kyndryl designs, builds, manages, and modernizes enterprise IT infrastructure systems. It is divided into six globally managed service areas:
 Cloud
 Applications, data, and AI
 Core enterprise and zCloud
 Digital workplace
 Network and edge computing
 Security and resiliency. 

It also has a customer advisory practice that combines managed services, advisory services and implementation. 

It operates in 63 countries and manages over 400 data centers.

Kyndryl partnered with Microsoft to provide digital transformation services using Microsoft Cloud products. Under the agreement, Microsoft became Kyndryl's Premier Global Alliance Partner, working together to accelerate hybrid cloud adoption, modernize business applications and processes, support workloads, and enable modern work experiences.

On January 31, 2022, Kyndryl announced it was changing its measures of geographic segment performance to Revenue and Adjusted EBITDA.

It formed a strategic partnership with Google Cloud focused on digital transformation projects and helping enterprise customers become more data-driven and sustainable, combining the firms' capabilities in data and analytics, artificial intelligence, and infrastructure modernization.

On 23 Feb 2023, Kyndryl announced a 5-year extended agreement with Delta Air Lines to enhance its IT resiliency and scalability.

References

External links 
 

Corporate spin-offs
IBM
Publicly traded companies based in New York City
Companies listed on the New York Stock Exchange
American companies established in 2020
Technology companies established in 2020
2020 establishments in New York City